Ciprian Gheorghe Răduțoiu (born 19 February 1987) is a Romanian professional footballer who plays as a defender for KSE Târgu Secuiesc.

References

External links
 
 

1987 births
Living people
People from Bacău
Romanian footballers
Association football defenders
Liga I players
Liga II players
CSM Jiul Petroșani players
FCM Bacău players
Sepsi OSK Sfântu Gheorghe players
SR Brașov players